fcron is a computer program with a GNU General Public License (GNU GPL) license that performs periodic command scheduling. It has been developed on Linux and should work on POSIX systems. As with Anacron, it does not assume that the system is running continuously, and can run in systems that do not run all the time or regularly. It aims to replace Vixie-cron and Anacron with a single integrated program, providing many features missing from the original Cron daemon.

Some of the supported options permit:
 run jobs one by one
 set the max system load average value under which the job should be run
 set a nice value for a job
 run jobs at fcron's startup if they should have been run during system down time
 mail user to tell them a job has not run and why
 run fcron by scripts
 run several instances of fcron simultaneously
 have fcron exit after it has run the pending jobs

See also 

 Cron
 List of Unix commands

References

External links 
 

Unix process- and task-management-related software